KOGD may refer to:

 Ogden-Hinckley Airport (ICAO code KOGD)
 KOGD-LP, a low-power radio station (107.1 FM) licensed to serve Shawnee, Oklahoma, United States